Miss Philippines Earth (2004–2017, 2019–present), originally titled Miss Philippines (2001–2003) then Miss Earth Philippines (2018), is a national beauty pageant held annually in search of "the most beautiful and environmentally-conscious and aware woman" in the Philippines.

The grand winner of the pageant represents the Philippines in Miss Earth, one of the Big Four international beauty pageants – the most coveted beauty titles among all the international pageant competitions.

The current titleholder of the pageant is Jenny Ramp of Santa Ignacia, Tarlac who was crowned on August 6, 2022 in Coron, Palawan. The elemental queens are, namely, Angel Santos (Miss Philippines Water), Jimema Tempra (Miss Philippines Air), Eryka Tan (Miss Philippines Fire) and Nyce Lampad (Miss Philippines Eco-tourism).

History

The Miss Philippines Earth was founded in 2001 by Carousel Productions headed by its president, Ramon Monzon who is also the president, CEO, and director of the Philippine Stock Exchange and chairman of the PSE Foundation, Inc. and spearheaded by Ramon's wife Lorraine Schuck as executive vice president and Peachy Veneracion as the vice president and project director.

Carousel Productions relinquished the franchise for both Mutya ng Pilipinas (Beauty of the Philippines) and Miss Asia Pacific International beauty contests in 2001 and decided to establish a beauty pageant whose cause is to promote environmental preservation. As a result, Miss Philippines (currently called Miss Philippines Earth) and Miss Earth pageants were established.

Miss Philippines beauty pageant was formally launched in a press conference on 3 April 2001 with the search of a delegate to represent Philippines in the international Miss Earth pageant. The pageant has tie-ins with the Philippine government agencies such as the Philippine Department of Tourism (DoT), Department of Environment and Natural Resources (DENR), the Metropolitan Manila Development Authority (MMDA), as well as international environmental groups such as the United Nations Environment Programme (UNEP) and Greenpeace to further its environmental advocacy.

In its formative years, the pageant was simply known as Miss Philippines (2001–2003) and then it was changed to Miss Philippines Earth (2004–2017, 2019–present) since the winner represents the Philippines to the Miss Earth pageant. In 2018, the title was renamed to Miss Earth Philippines to emphasize the global "Miss Earth" brand. However, in 2019, the pageant reverted its name to "Miss Philippines Earth" to assert to its legal rights claim since Carousel Productions legally owns the trademark "Miss Philippines" title according to its executive vice president, Lorraine Schuck.

The pageant contestants are called Beauties for a Cause. The competition includes swimsuit competition, evening gown parade, talent competition, but more weight is given to personality and also to ecological and environmental intelligence in the interview portion.

Legacy project
Annually, the winner of Miss Philippines Earth and her elemental court embarked with a legacy project. It started in 2006, when Miss Philippines Earth 2006 Cathy Untalan and her elemental court wrote a book titled 'Bakawan' (Mangrove Forest) which was used by the Philippine Department of Education's "Bright Minds Read Campaign" and in the Philippine Daily Inquirer newspaper's read-alongs project.

In 2007, the Miss Philippines Earth 2007 winners created reusable bags made of plastic scraps as part of the "I Love ME project" campaign. In 2008, the Miss Philippines Earth 2008 winners came up with "20k OK" project, wherein they planted 20,000 seedlings in the different areas of the Philippines.

In 2009, the Miss Philippines Earth 2009 winners came up with a documentary film, "Project Noel" and won the first Loren Legarda Environment Award. The Miss Philippines Earth 2011 created used photos and handmade puppets as part of Read-Along session to children to illustrate the dangers of improper disposal of plastic wastes.

Delegates
In the early years of the pageant, Carousel Productions held preliminary contests in 12 regions of the Philippines from 2001 to 2007, through its local franchises. The winners of those contest in turn competed with 12 more contestants from the National Capital Region for the Miss Philippines Earth title.

Carousel Productions opened the contest in 2006 to Filipina women of foreign ancestry, or from those living abroad such as Australia, France, Germany, United Arab Emirates and the United States.

In 2008, Miss Philippines Earth broadened its coverage to include candidates from various provinces, cities, and selected municipalities..

The grand winner of Miss Philippines Earth goes on to represent her country in the Miss Earth pageant.

Awards and titles
Just like in Miss Earth pageant, the winner of the beauty contest is bestowed the title Miss Philippines Earth. From 2004, her runners-up are also given titles named after the other natural elements: Miss Eco Tourism (fourth runner-up), Miss Fire (equivalent to third runner-up), Miss Water (second runner-up), and Miss Air (first runner-up). From 2001 to 2003, the runners-up do not have titles, they only are called fourth runner-up, third runner-up, second runner-up and first runner-up. Miss Earth is the only one of the "Big Four" pageants which have individual titles for the runners-up.

In 2009, Carousel Productions, changed the ranking of the runners up and winners. The judges now select 10 finalists to compete for the top five. The top five then vie for the grand crown (now-called Miss Philippines Earth). The four elemental court of the Miss Philippines Earth winner namely: Miss Philippines Air, Miss Philippines Water, Miss Philippines Fire, and Miss Philippines Eco-Tourism are all equal winners and the remaining five finalists that failed to advance in the top five are the Runners-up of the pageant.

Titleholders

See also

Binibining Pilipinas
Mutya ng Pilipinas
Miss Republic of the Philippines
Miss World Philippines
Miss Universe Philippines
Big Four international beauty pageants
Philippines at major beauty pageants
List of beauty contests

References

External links

Philippines
Beauty pageants in the Philippines
Philippine awards